Bernard McKenna (born 1944) is a Scottish writer/producer who has written, or co-written, many hours of British television comedy. He is most known for his work with Graham Chapman of Monty Python fame as well as his collaborations with Peter Cook and Douglas Adams. He has occasionally worked as an actor, and had several roles in Monty Python's Life of Brian.

McKenna previously taught creative writing, screenwriting and comedy at the University of Winchester.

Writing
His writing work includes:
Doctor in the House (1969–1977)
Doctor Down Under (1979)
The Top Secret Life of Edgar Briggs (1974)
Out of the Trees (1975)
Robin's Nest (1977–1981)
The Odd Job (1978)
Shelley (1979–1992)
Peter Cook & Co (1980)
Yellowbeard (1983)
Me and My Girl (1984–1988)
Brotherly Love (1999)
Bad Boys
Pilgrim's Rest

Production
His production work includes:

The New Statesman (1987–1994)
Get Back (1992)
Over The Rainbow

Actor

Monty Python's Life of Brian (1979) – Parvus / Official Stoners Helper / Giggling Guard / Sergeant
Effects (1978) – Barney
Yellowbeard (1983) – Askey

References

External links
 

1944 births
Living people
Scottish television writers